Devil's Got Your Tongue is the fifteenth album by Abbey Lincoln, and her third for Verve Records. It was released on October 13, 1992. The album peaked at No. 2 on the Billboard Jazz Albums chart on April 10, 1993.

Critical reception
AllMusic says that "the set consists primarily of her own compositions" and that "it's gratifying to see a major jazz label allowing Lincoln's musical vision to flourish and grow".

Track listing

Musicians

Abbey Lincoln – vocals
Rodney Kendrick – piano
Marcus McLaurine – bass
Grady Tate – drums (tracks 2–4, 10–11)
Yoron Israel – drums (tracks 1, 5, 6, 8–9)
James Louis "J.J." Johnson – trombone (tracks 2, 4, 10)
Stanley Turrentine – tenor saxophone (tracks 5, 8, 10–11)
Maxine Roach – viola (tracks 2, 6)
Babatunde Olatunji – Ngoma, Djembe, Ashiko & Shekere drums (track 7)
Kehinde O'Uhuru – Ashiko drum (track 7)
Sule O'Uhuru – Agogô bells, Djembe (track 7)
Gordy Ryan – Jun-jun drum (track 7)
The Staple Singers – backing vocals
Pops Staples, Mavis Staples, Cleotha Staples
The Noel Singers – backup singers
Ivan Archer, Giselle Brown, Queinton Caesar, Ronnie David, Shelby Ellis, Daylene Hunt, Clevie Jordan, Marie Leveque, Lucila Martinez, Jason Moses, Gregory Norman, Leigh-Ann Oadmore, Aleata Prince, Natasha Reeves, Tiffany Rivera, Linda Sanchez, Joann Santiago Sherrille Shabazz, Chante Slater, Karen Thompson, Teddy Turrene, Merlene West, Tasha Woodward

Production

Producer – Jean-Philippe Allard
Engineer (First Engineer) – Rick Applegate
Engineer (Second Engineer) – Jay Newland
Engineer (Assistant Engineer) – Doug McKean
Engineer (Assistant Engineer) – Sandy Palmer

Track information and credits adapted from the album's liner notes.

Charts

References

1992 albums
Abbey Lincoln albums
Verve Records albums